Cheshmeh Sefid-e Sofla (also Romanized as Cheshmeh Sefīd-e Soflá; also known as Cheshmeh Sefīd and Kānī Chamrow-e Tofangī) is a village in Gurani Rural District, Gahvareh District, Dalahu County, Kermanshah Province, Iran. At the 2006 census, its population was 69, in 19 families.

References 

Populated places in Dalahu County